Djupvatnet is a lake in extreme southeastern Stranda Municipality in Møre og Romsdal county, Norway. The lake is part of the headwaters of the Otta river system which flows southeast into the lake Breiddalsvatnet and on into Oppland county.

Norwegian County Road 63 follows the northern shore of the lake. The mountain Dalsnibba is located immediately northwest of the lake, and there is a road leading to the top that begins on the northwest side of the lake.

See also
List of lakes in Norway

References

Stranda
Lakes of Møre og Romsdal